Gracia may refer to:

Places
 Gràcia, a district of Barcelona, Catalonia, Spain
 Passeig de Gràcia, a street
 Carrer Gran de Gràcia, a street
 Travessera de Gràcia, a street
 Alta Gracia, a city located in the Province of Córdoba, Argentina

Given name
 Hosokawa Gracia (1563–1600), daughter of the samurai Akechi Mitsuhide during the Sengoku era of Japan
 Gracia Mendes Nasi (1510–1569), Renaissance Jewish businesswoman
 Gracia Hillman, member of the Election Assistance Commission in the United States
 Gracia Baylor, Australian politician
 Gracia Baur (born 1982), German singer
Gracia Shadrack, Vanuatuan politician
Gracia Gouldbourn

Surname
Cedric Gracia, French cyclist
Javi Gracia, Spanish footballer and football manager
Malena Gracia (born 1971), Spanish actress, singer, and TV presenter
Rubén Gracia, Spanish footballer 
Sancho Gracia, Spanish actor

Other uses
 Gracia (Saint-Émilion), a Bordeaux garagiste winery
 La Campana de Gràcia, Catalan weekly satirical magazine

See also
García (disambiguation)
Grazia